7flix is an Australian free-to-air digital television multichannel, which was launched by the Seven Network on 28 February 2016.

7flix targets a variety of viewers and offers drama, comedy, reality, docusoap, and movies.

History

On 18 December 2015, a test pattern began broadcasting on channel 76 reading “New Channel Coming Soon”. Seven acknowledged the broadcast and director of programming Angus Ross formally announced on 1 February 2016 that Seven was launching a new channel and more details would be released soon. During the ad-break of miniseries Molly on 7 February 2016, Seven announced that channel 76 would be named 7flix and would be launched on 28 February 2016. The “New Channel” test pattern then got replaced with a continuous promo loop for 7flix.

7flix began broadcasting at 6am on 28 February 2016 in MPEG-4, as seen in a YouTube video showing the promo loop ending and a re-run of Once Upon A Time starting afterwards. The channel airs movies in its prime time slots with television series and other entertainment at other times. 7flix was added to Seven's live-streaming service PLUS7 Live upon its launch.

On 13 April 2016, it was announced the channel would amend its schedule, shifting its focus from movies to more American dramas. This change began in the weeks prior, when Grey's Anatomy premiered at 8:30pm, which was initially designated as a "movie-exclusive" time slot. The change also saw the addition of repeats of Criminal Minds to Thursday nights.

On 3 June 2016, 7flix became available on more TVs as the channel switched to MPEG-2.

On 3 August 2017, 18 months after launching in metropolitan areas, Prime7 announced that it would carry 7flix to regional stations in northern and southern New South Wales, regional Victoria and Mildura. The channel launched at 6:00 am on 3 September on digital channel 66, in an MPEG-4 format.

In December 2019, the Seven Network announced that 7flix would rebrand in 2020 to target a young female audience. In July 2020, the Seven Network unveiled its new rebranding of 7flix, with a new purple ribbon-like design and text and on air graphics to coincide with the revamp of its multichannel stations.

Programming

The launch titles for 7flix included new episodes of US series Once Upon A Time, The Muppets, The Mindy Project, Cougar Town, and The Amazing Race, which had previously debuted on the Seven Network. Premiere series such as Black-ish, Grandfathered, Galavant and Agent Carter debuted at a later date. Throughout 2016, new episodes of Agents of S.H.I.E.L.D., Grey's Anatomy, How to Get Away with Murder, Quantico and Scandal aired exclusively on the channel. Also featured on the channel were marathons of The Big Bang Theory, but this series now is on 10 Peach.

7flix initially aired a variety of children's series from Disney including Austin & Ally, Dog with a Blog, I Didn't Do It, Jessie, Kirby Buckets, Lab Rats and Mighty Med. The daytime schedule for the channel consists of classic sitcoms such as Benson, Bewitched, Good Times, I Dream of Jeannie and Who's The Boss? 7flix also airs encores of local programmes from the Seven Network, including House Rules and First Dates.

In 2017, US drama The Astronaut Wives Club debuted, along with the premieres of comedy series Marry Me, Bad Teacher, Dr. Ken and The Real O'Neals. Australian comedy short form series Bent 101 also made its debut on the channel.

How I Met Your Mother was added to 7flix in 2018, returning to the Seven Network as part of a deal with Fox.

7flix aired content from the defunct 7food network channel until 1 December 2020.

The network also has ongoing content new and classic film and television brands from Warner Bros. Pictures, 20th Century Studios, Walt Disney Pictures, Marvel Studios, Lucasfilm, Sony Pictures and Universal Pictures.

Current programming

Adult animation

 American Dad! 
 Family Guy 
 Futurama
 The Simpsons

Children

 Beat Bugs
 Drop Dead Weird
 Flushed
 Get Arty
 It's Academic
 Match It
 Motown Magic
 News of the Wild
 The Wild Adventures of Blinky Bill
 ZooMoo

Comedy

 How I Met Your Mother
 Modern Family

Drama

 Agents of S.H.I.E.L.D.
 The Blacklist
 Bones 
 Criminal Minds
 Grey's Anatomy
 The Guardian
 How to Get Away with Murder
 Nikita
 Nip/Tuck
 Smallville
 The Mentalist
 Ramsay's Hotel Hell
 Ramsay's Kitchen Nightmares

News and documentaries

 Dynamo: Magician Impossible Tricked What Really Happens in Bali What Really Happens in Thailand The ZooReality

 The Amazing Race Australian Spartan Back with the Ex Bride & Prejudice House Rules The Mentor My Kitchen Rules Whodunnit? Yummy Mummies Zumbo's Just DessertsReligious
 Life Today with James RobisonUpcoming programming

 The Cleveland Show (adult animation)
 The Wonderful World of DisneyRobot ChickenFormer programming
Children

 The 7D (2016–18)
 A.N.T. Farm (2016–17)
 Austin & Ally (2016–18)
 Best Friends Whenever (2017–19)
 Crash & Bernstein (2016–18)
 The Deep (2018–20)
 Dog with a Blog (2016–19)
 The Evermoor Chronicles (2017–19)
 Fish Hooks (2016–17)
 Gamer's Guide to Pretty Much Everything (2016–19)
 Girl Meets World (2017–19)
 Good Luck Charlie (2016–17)
 Gravity Falls (2016–19)
 Hairy Legs (2018)
 History Hunters (2017–18)
 I Didn't Do It (2016–19)
 In Your Dreams (2017–19)
 Jessie (2016–19)
 K.C. Undercover (2016–18)
 Kickin' It (2016–18)
 Kirby Buckets (2016–19)
 Kitty is Not a Cat (2018–20)
 Lab Rats (2016–19)
 Liv and Maddie (2017–19)
 Mighty Med (2016–18)
 Oh Yuck! (2017)
 Paddle Pop: Atlantos (2016)
 Pair of Kings (2016–17)
 Penn Zero: Part-Time Hero (2017–19)
 Phineas and Ferb (2016–17)
 Pickle and Peanut (2017–19)
 Randy Cunningham: 9th Grade Ninja (2016–18)
 Sally Bollywood: Super Detective (2020)
 Saturday Disney (2016)
 Shake it Up (2016)
 Spit it Out (2017–21)
 Star vs. the Forces of Evil (2017–19)
 Star Wars Rebels (2017–18; moved to 9Go!) 
 Tashi (2018–19)
 Wander Over Yonder (2017–19)
 Win, Lose or Draw (2017)
 The Woodlies (2017)
 Zeke and Luther (2016)

Preschool

 Art Attack (2016–18)
 Doc McStuffins (2016–19)
 Henry Hugglemonster (2016–19)
 Jake and the Never Land Pirates (2016–19)
 The Lion Guard (2016–19; moved to 9Go!) 
 Mickey Mouse Clubhouse (2016–18)
 Miles from Tomorrowland (2016–18)
 Sheriff Callie's Wild West (2016–17)
 Sofia the First (2016–19; moved to 9Go!) 

Comedy

 Agent Anna Bad Teacher Benson Bewitched (Now on 9Go!)
 The Big Bang Theory (2016–17; Now on 9Go! Later on 10 Peach)
 Black-ish 
 Cougar Town Diff'rent Strokes Dr. Ken Family Tools (2016–17)
 Galavant (2016)
 The Goldbergs Good Times Grandfathered Happy Endings (2016)
 I Dream of Jeannie (Now on 9Go!)
 Just Shoot Me! Malibu Country (2016–17)
 Manhattan Love Story Married... with Children Marry Me "M.A.S.H" (now on 9Go!)
 Men at Work The Mindy Project (2016–17) (Now on 9Go!)
 Mixology The Muppets Scrubs Seinfeld (Now on 10 Peach)
 The Nanny (Now on 9Go!)
 The Neighbors The Real O'Neals Trophy Wife Who's The Boss?Drama

 800 Words Agent Carter (2016)
 American Crime The Astronaut Wives Club Battle Creek Betrayal Blindspot Body of Proof (2016–17)
 Castle Code Black Covert Affairs (2016)
 Criminal Minds: Beyond Borders Criminal Minds: Suspect Behavior Defiance The Good Doctor (Now on Channel 7)
 Grimm Hoges: The Paul Hogan Story Intelligence Liar Mistresses Molly (2016)
 Motive (2016)
 Odyssey Once Upon A Time Once Upon a Time in Wonderland Private Practice (2016)
 Quantico (2016–17)
 Red Band Society Red Widow (2016–17)
 Resurrection Revenge Royal Pains Scandal The Secret Daughter State of Affairs The Tomorrow People Wanted (2017)
 Zero Hour (2016)

News and documentaries
 Australia: The Story of Us Border Security: Australia's Front Line The Force: Behind the Line (2017)
 Highway Cops (2017)

Game shows
 Behave Yourself! CannonballReality

 The Aussie Property Flippers (2017)
 The Amazing Race Australia Bringing Sexy Back Celebrity Splash First Dates (Australia) First Dates (UK) Instant Hotel Hell's Kitchen Australia Kiss Bang Love Little Big Shots Restaurant Revolution (2016)
 Seven Year Switch Ramsay's Costa Del Nightmares (2016)

CookingBarefoot ContessaBeach Bites with Katie LeeBrunch at Bobby'sCake WarsChoppedCupcake WarsCutthroat KitchenDiners, Drive-Ins and DivesFood Network StarGiada at HomeThe Great Food Truck RaceGuy's Big BiteGuy's Grocery GamesHoliday Baking ChampionshipIron Chef AmericaKids Baking ChampionshipThe KitchenMystery DinersThe Pioneer WomanRestaurant: ImpossibleSpring Baking ChampionshipThrowdown! with Bobby FlayLifestyle
 Anh Does...Soap opera
 Home and AwayAvailability
7flix is controlled from Broadcast Centre Melbourne and then transmitted via MediaHub in Sydney.

7flix is available in MPEG-2 standard definition digital in metropolitan areas and regional Queensland through Seven Network's owned-and-operated stations including ATN Sydney, HSV Melbourne, BTQ Brisbane, SAS Adelaide, TVW Perth, STQ Queensland and NEN northern New South Wales/Gold Coast, CBN southern New South Wales/ACT, AMV Victoria and PTV Mildura/Sunraysia.

7flix became available to Foxtel cable subscribers with iQ3, iQ2 and iQ1.5 set top boxes on Channel 187 from 24 March 2016.

Logo and identity history
At launch in February 2016, the logo used the generic logo of the Seven Network, with the red colour being replaced by pink, and the word "flix", written in italic lowercase letters, added next to it, but using its gradients.

On 24 July 2020, Seven Network unveiled its new 7flix logo, dropping the gradient pink logo and italic text in place of a solid purple logo and non-italic text as part of a major overhaul of its multichannel stations.

Slogans
2016–2020: We've Got the Fix2020–present: Better Together''

See also

List of digital television channels in Australia

References

External links

Seven Network
Movie channels in Australia
Digital terrestrial television in Australia
English-language television stations in Australia
Television channels and stations established in 2016
2016 establishments in Australia